Infertility is the inability of a person, animal or plant to reproduce by natural means. It is usually not the natural state of a healthy adult, except notably among certain eusocial species (mostly haplodiploid insects). It is the normal state of a human child or other young offspring, because they have not undergone puberty, which is the body's start of reproductive capacity.

In humans, infertility is the inability to become pregnant after one year of unprotected and regular sexual intercourse  involving a male and female partner. There are many causes of infertility, including some that medical intervention can treat. Estimates from 1997 suggest that worldwide about five percent of all heterosexual couples have an unresolved problem with infertility. Many more couples, however, experience involuntary childlessness for at least one year: estimates range from 12% to 28%.
The main cause of infertility in humans is age, and an advanced maternal age can raise the probability of suffering a spontaneous abortion during pregnancy.

Male infertility is responsible for 20–30% of infertility cases, while 20–35% are due to female infertility, and 25–40% are due to combined problems in both parts. In 10–20% of cases, no cause is found. The most common cause of female infertility is the age, which generally manifest themselves by sparse or absent menstrual periods.  Male infertility is most commonly due to deficiencies in the semen, and semen quality is used as a surrogate measure of male fecundity.

Women who are fertile experience a period of fertility before and during ovulation, and are infertile for the rest of the menstrual cycle. Fertility awareness methods are used to discern when these changes occur by tracking changes in cervical mucus or basal body temperature.

Definition
"Demographers tend to define infertility as childlessness in a population of women of reproductive age," whereas the epidemiological definition refers to "trying for" or "time to" a pregnancy, generally in a population of women exposed to a probability of conception. Currently, female fertility normally peaks in young adulthood and diminishes after 35 with pregnancy occurring rarely after age 50. A female is most fertile within 24 hours of ovulation. Male fertility peaks usually in young adulthood and declines after age 40.

The time needed to pass (during which the couple tries to conceive) for that couple to be diagnosed with infertility differs between different jurisdictions. Existing definitions of infertility lack uniformity, rendering comparisons in prevalence between countries or over time problematic. Therefore, data estimating the prevalence of infertility cited by various sources differ significantly. A couple that tries unsuccessfully to have a child after a certain period of time (often a short period, but definitions vary) is sometimes said to be subfertile, meaning less fertile than a typical couple. Both infertility and subfertility are defined as the inability to conceive after a certain period of time (the length of which vary), so often the two terms overlap.

World Health Organization
The World Health Organization defines infertility as follows:

United States
One definition of infertility that is frequently used in the United States by reproductive endocrinologists, doctors who specialize in infertility, to consider a couple eligible for treatment is:
 a woman under 35 has not conceived after 12 months of contraceptive-free intercourse. Twelve months is the lower reference limit for Time to Pregnancy (TTP) by the World Health Organization.
 a woman over 35 has not conceived after six months of contraceptive-free sexual intercourse.

These time intervals would seem to be reversed; this is an area where public policy trumps science. The idea is that for women beyond age 35, every month counts and if made to wait another six months to prove the necessity of medical intervention, the problem could become worse. The corollary to this is that, by definition, failure to conceive in women under 35 is not regarded with the same urgency as it is in those over 35.

United Kingdom
In the UK, previous NICE guidelines defined infertility as failure to conceive after regular unprotected sexual intercourse for two years in the absence of known reproductive pathology. Updated NICE guidelines do not include a specific definition, but recommend that "A woman of reproductive age who has not conceived after 1 year of unprotected vaginal sexual intercourse, in the absence of any known cause of infertility, should be offered further clinical assessment and investigation along with her partner, with earlier referral to a specialist if the woman is over 36 years of age."

Other definitions
Researchers commonly base demographic studies on infertility prevalence over a five-year period. Practical measurement problems, however, exist for any definition, because it is difficult to measure continuous exposure to the risk of pregnancy over a period of years.

Primary vs. secondary infertility
Primary infertility is defined as the absence of a live birth for women who desire a child and have been in a union for at least 12 months, during which they have not used any contraceptives. The World Health Organisation also adds that 'women whose pregnancy spontaneously miscarries, or whose pregnancy results in a still born child, without ever having had a live birth would present with primarily infertility'.

Secondary infertility is defined as the absence of a live birth for women who desire a child and have been in a union for at least 12 months since their last live birth, during which they did not use any contraceptives.

Thus the distinguishing feature is whether or not the couple have ever had a pregnancy that led to a live birth.

Effects

Psychological
The consequences of infertility are manifold and can include societal repercussions and personal suffering. Advances in assisted reproductive technologies, such as IVF, can offer hope to many couples where treatment is available, although barriers exist in terms of medical coverage and affordability. The medicalization of infertility has unwittingly led to a disregard for the emotional responses that couples experience, which include distress, loss of control, stigmatization, and a disruption in the developmental trajectory of adulthood. One of the main challenges in assessing the distress levels in women with infertility is the accuracy of self-report measures. It is possible that women "fake good" in order to appear mentally healthier than they are. It is also possible that women feel a sense of hopefulness/increased optimism prior to initiating infertility treatment, which is when most assessments of distress are collected. Some early studies concluded that infertile women did not report any significant differences in symptoms of anxiety and depression than fertile women. The further into treatment a patient goes, the more often they display symptoms of depression and anxiety. Patients with one treatment failure had significantly higher levels of anxiety, and patients with two failures experienced more depression when compared with those without a history of treatment. However, it has also been shown that the more depressed the infertile woman, the less likely she is to start infertility treatment and the more likely she is to drop out after only one cycle. Researchers have also shown that despite a good prognosis and having the finances available to pay for treatment, discontinuation is most often due to psychological reasons. Fertility does not seem to increase when the women takes antioxidants to reduce the oxidative stress brought by the situation.

Infertility may have psychological effects. Parenthood is one of the major transitions in adult life for both men and women. The stress of the non-fulfilment of a wish for a child has been associated with emotional consequences such as anger, depression, anxiety, marital problems and feelings of worthlessness.
Partners may become more anxious to conceive, increasing sexual dysfunction. Marital discord often develops, especially when they are under pressure to make medical decisions. Women trying to conceive often have depression rates similar to women who have heart disease or cancer. Emotional stress and marital difficulties are greater in couples where the infertility lies with the man.
Male and female partner respond differently to infertility problems. In general, women show higher depression levels than their male partners when dealing with infertility. A possible explanation may be that women feel more responsible and guilty than men during the process of trying to conceive. On the other hand, infertile men experience a psychosomatic distress.

Social
Having a child is considered to be important in most societies. Infertile couples may experience social and family pressure leading to a feeling of social isolation. Factors of gender, age, religion, and socioeconomic status are important influences. Societal pressures may affect a couple's decision to approach, avoid, or experience an infertility treatment.
Moreover, the socioeconomic status influences the psychology of the infertile couples: low socioeconomic status is associated with increased chances of developing depression.
In many cultures, inability to conceive bears a stigma. In closed social groups, a degree of rejection (or a sense of being rejected by the couple) may cause considerable anxiety and disappointment. Some respond by actively avoiding the issue altogether; middle-class men are the most likely to respond in this way.

In the United States some treatments for infertility, including diagnostic tests, surgery and therapy for depression, can qualify one for Family and Medical Leave Act leave. It has been suggested that infertility be classified as a form of disability.

Causes
Male infertility is responsible for 20–30% of infertility cases, while 20–35% are due to female infertility, and 25–40% are due to combined problems in both parts. In 10–20% of cases, no cause is found. The most common cause of female infertility is the are ovulation problems, usually manifested by scanty or absent menstrual periods..  Male infertility is most commonly due to deficiencies in the semen, and semen quality is used as a surrogate measure of male fecundity.

Iodine Deficiency 
Iodine deficiency may lead to infertility.

Natural infertility 
Before puberty, humans are naturally infertile; their gonads have not yet developed the gametes required to reproduce: boys' testicles have not developed the sperm cells required to impregnate a female; girls have not begun the process of ovulation which activates the fertility of their egg cells (ovulation is confirmed by the first menstrual cycle, known as menarche, which signals the biological possibility of pregnancy). Infertility in children is commonly referred to as prepubescence (or being prepubescent, an adjective used to also refer to humans without secondary sex characteristics).

The absence of fertility in children is considered a natural part of human growth and child development, as the hypothalamus in their brain is still underdeveloped and cannot release the hormones required to activate the gonads' gametes. Fertility in children before the ages of eight or nine is considered a disease known as precocious puberty. This disease is usually triggered by a brain tumor or other related injury.

Delayed puberty 

Delayed puberty, puberty absent past or occurring later than the average onset (between the ages of ten and fourteen), may be a cause of infertility. In the United States, girls are considered to have delayed puberty if they have not started menstruating by age 16 (alongside lacking breast development by age 13). Boys are considered to have delayed puberty if they lack enlargement of the testicles by age 14. Delayed puberty affects about 2% of adolescents.

Most commonly, puberty may be delayed for several years and still occur normally, in which case it is considered constitutional delay of growth and puberty, a common variation of healthy physical development. Delay of puberty may also occur due to various causes such as malnutrition, various systemic diseases, or defects of the reproductive system (hypogonadism) or the body's responsiveness to sex hormones.

Immune infertility 
Antisperm antibodies (ASA) have been considered as infertility cause in around 10–30% of infertile couples. In both men and women, ASA production are directed against surface antigens on sperm, which can interfere with sperm motility and transport through the female reproductive tract, inhibiting capacitation and acrosome reaction, impaired fertilization, influence on the implantation process, and impaired growth and development of the embryo. The antibodies are classified into different groups: There are IgA, IgG and IgM antibodies. They also differ in the location of the spermatozoon they bind on (head, mid piece, tail). Factors contributing to the formation of antisperm antibodies in women are disturbance of normal immunoregulatory mechanisms, infection, violation of the integrity of the mucous membranes, rape and unprotected oral or anal sex. Risk factors for the formation of antisperm antibodies in men include the breakdown of the blood‑testis barrier, trauma and surgery, orchitis, varicocele, infections, prostatitis, testicular cancer, failure of immunosuppression and unprotected receptive anal or oral sex with men.

Sexually transmitted infections
Infections with the following sexually transmitted pathogens have a negative effect on fertility: Chlamydia trachomatis and Neisseria gonorrhoeae. There is a consistent association of Mycoplasma genitalium infection and female reproductive tract syndromes. M. genitalium infection is associated with increased risk of infertility.

Genetic

Mutations to NR5A1 gene encoding steroidogenic factor 1 (SF-1) have been found in a small subset of men with non-obstructive male factor infertility where the cause is unknown. Results of one study investigating a cohort of 315 men revealed changes within the hinge region of SF-1 and no rare allelic variants in fertile control men. Affected individuals displayed more severe forms of infertility such as azoospermia and severe oligozoospermia.

Small supernumerary marker chromosomes are abnormal extra chromosomes; they are three times more likely to occur in infertile individuals and account for 0.125% of all infertility cases. See Infertility associated with small supernumerary marker chromosomes and Genetics of infertility#Small supernumerary marker chromosomes and infertility.

Other causes 
Factors that can cause male as well as female infertility are:
 DNA damage
 DNA damage reduces fertility in female ovocytes, as caused by smoking, other xenobiotic DNA damaging agents (such as radiation or chemotherapy) or accumulation of the oxidative DNA damage 8-hydroxy-deoxyguanosine
 DNA damage reduces fertility in male sperm, as caused by oxidative DNA damage, smoking, other xenobiotic DNA damaging agents (such as drugs or chemotherapy) or other DNA damaging agents including reactive oxygen species, fever or high testicular temperature. The damaged DNA related to infertility manifests itself by the increased susceptibility to denaturation inducible by heat or acid or by the presence of double-strand breaks that can be detected by the TUNEL assay. In this assay, the sperm's DNA will be denaturated and renatured. If DNA fragmentation occurs (double and single-strand-breaks) a halo will not appear surrounding the spermatozoas, but if the spermatozoa does not have DNA damaged, a halo surrounding the spermatozoa could be visualized under the microscope. 
 General factors
 Diabetes mellitus, thyroid disorders, undiagnosed and untreated coeliac disease, adrenal disease
 Hypothalamic-pituitary factors
 
 Hyperprolactinemia
 Hypopituitarism
 The presence of anti-thyroid antibodies is associated with an increased risk of unexplained subfertility with an odds ratio of 1.5 and 95% confidence interval of 1.1–2.0.
 Environmental factors
 Toxins such as glues, volatile organic solvents or silicones, physical agents, chemical dusts, and pesticides. Tobacco smokers are 60% more likely to be infertile than non-smokers.

German scientists have reported that a virus called adeno-associated virus might have a role in male infertility, though it is otherwise not harmful. Other diseases such as chlamydia, and gonorrhea can also cause infertility, due to internal scarring (fallopian tube obstruction).
 Alimentary habits
 Obesity: Obesity can have a significant impact on male and female fertility. BMI (body mass index) may be a significant factor in fertility, as an increase in BMI in the male by as little as three units can be associated with infertility. Several studies have demonstrated that an increase in BMI is correlated with a decrease in sperm concentration, a decrease in motility and an increase in DNA damage in sperm. A relationship also exists between obesity and erectile dysfunction (ED). ED may be the consequence of the conversion of androgens to estradiol. The enzyme aromatase is responsible for this conversion and is found primarily in adipose tissue. As the number of adipose tissue increases, there is more aromatase available to convert androgens, and serum estradiol levels increase. Other hormones including inhibin B and leptin, may also be affected by obesity. Inhibin B levels have been reported to decrease with increasing weight, which results in decreased Sertoli cells and sperm production. Leptin is a hormone associated with numerous effects including appetite control, inflammation, and decreased insulin secretion, according to many studies.  Obese women have a higher rate of recurrent, early miscarriage compared to non-obese women.
 Low weight: Obesity is not the only way in which weight can impact fertility. Men who are underweight tend to have lower sperm concentrations than those who are at a normal BMI. For women, being underweight and having extremely low amounts of body fat are associated with ovarian dysfunction and infertility and they have a higher risk for preterm birth. Eating disorders such as anorexia nervosa are also associated with extremely low BMI. Although relatively uncommon, eating disorders can negatively affect menstruation, fertility, and maternal and fetal well-being.

Females

The following causes of infertility may only be found in females.
For a woman to conceive, certain things have to happen: vaginal intercourse must take place around the time when an egg is released from her ovary; the system that produces eggs has to be working at optimum levels; and her hormones must be balanced.

For women, problems with fertilization arise mainly from either structural problems in the Fallopian tube or uterus or problems releasing eggs. Infertility may be caused by blockage of the Fallopian tube due to malformations, infections such as chlamydia or scar tissue. For example, endometriosis can cause infertility with the growth of endometrial tissue in the Fallopian tubes or around the ovaries. Endometriosis is usually more common in women in their mid-twenties and older, especially when postponed childbirth has taken place.

Another major cause of infertility in women may be the inability to ovulate. Ovulatory disorders make up 25% of the known causes of female infertility. Oligo-ovulation or anovulation results in infertility because no oocyte will be released monthly. In the absence of an oocyte, there is no opportunity for fertilization and pregnancy. World Health Organization subdivided ovulatory disorders into four classes:
 Hypogonadotropic hypogonadal anovulation: i.e., hypothalamic amenorrhea
 Normogonadotropic normoestrogenic anovulation: i.e., polycystic ovarian syndrome (PCOS)
 Hypergonadotropic hypoestrogenic anovulation: i.e., premature ovarian failure
 Hyperprolactinemic anovulation: i.e., pituitary adenoma

Malformation of the eggs themselves may complicate conception.  For example, polycystic ovarian syndrome (PCOS) is when the eggs only partially develop within the ovary and there is an excess of male hormones. Some women are infertile because their ovaries do not mature and release eggs. In this case, synthetic FSH by injection or Clomid (Clomiphene citrate) via a pill can be given to stimulate follicles to mature in the ovaries.

Other factors that can affect a woman's chances of conceiving include being overweight or underweight, or her age as female fertility declines after the age of 30.

Sometimes it can be a combination of factors, and sometimes a clear cause is never established.

Common causes of infertility of females include:
 ovulation problems (e.g.  PCOS, the leading reason why women present to fertility clinics due to anovulatory infertility)
 tubal blockage
 pelvic inflammatory disease caused by infections like tuberculosis
 age-related factors
 uterine problems
 previous tubal ligation
 endometriosis
 advanced maternal age
 immune infertility

Males

Male infertility is defined as the inability of a male to make a fertile female pregnant, for a minimum of at least one year of unprotected intercourse. There are multiple causes for male infertility. These include endocrine disorders (usually due to hypogonadism) at an estimated 2% to 5%, sperm transport disorders (such as vasectomy) at 5%, primary testicular defects (which includes abnormal sperm parameters without any identifiable cause) at 65% to 80% and idiopathic (where an infertile male has normal sperm and semen parameters) at 10% to 20%.

The main cause of male infertility is low semen quality. In men who have the necessary reproductive organs to procreate, infertility can be caused by low sperm count due to endocrine problems, drugs, radiation, or infection.  There may be testicular malformations, hormone imbalance, or blockage of the man's duct system. Although many of these can be treated through surgery or hormonal substitutions, some may be indefinite.
Infertility associated with viable, but immotile sperm may be caused by primary ciliary dyskinesia. The sperm must provide the zygote with DNA, centrioles, and activation factor for the embryo to develop. A defect in any of these sperm structures may result in infertility that will not be detected by semen analysis. Antisperm antibodies cause immune infertility. Cystic fibrosis can lead to infertility in men.

Combined infertility
In some cases, both the man and woman may be infertile or sub-fertile, and the couple's infertility arises from the combination of these conditions. In other cases, the cause is suspected to be immunological or genetic; it may be that each partner is independently fertile but the couple cannot conceive together without assistance.

Unexplained infertility

In the US, up to 20% of infertile couples have unexplained infertility. In these cases, abnormalities are likely to be present but not detected by current methods. Possible problems could be that the egg is not released at the optimum time for fertilization, that it may not enter the fallopian tube, sperm may not be able to reach the egg, fertilization may fail to occur, transport of the zygote may be disturbed, or implantation fails. It is increasingly recognized that egg quality is of critical importance and women of advanced maternal age have eggs of reduced capacity for normal and successful fertilization.  Also, polymorphisms in folate pathway genes could be one reason for fertility complications in some women with unexplained infertility. However, a growing body of evidence suggests that epigenetic modifications in sperm may be partially responsible.

Diagnosis

If both partners are young and healthy and have been trying to conceive for one year without success, a visit to a physician or women's health nurse practitioner (WHNP) could help to highlight potential medical problems earlier rather than later. The doctor or WHNP may also be able to suggest lifestyle changes to increase the chances of conceiving.

Women over the age of 35 should see their physician or WHNP after six months as fertility tests can take some time to complete, and age may affect the treatment options that are open in that case.

A doctor or WHNP takes a medical history and gives a physical examination. They can also carry out some basic tests on both partners to see if there is an identifiable reason for not having achieved a pregnancy. If necessary, they refer patients to a fertility clinic or local hospital for more specialized tests. The results of these tests help determine the best fertility treatment.

Treatment
Treatment depends on the cause of infertility, but may include counselling, fertility treatments, which include in vitro fertilization. According to ESHRE recommendations, couples with an estimated live birth rate of 40% or higher per year are encouraged to continue aiming for a spontaneous pregnancy. Treatment methods for infertility may be grouped as medical or complementary and alternative treatments. Some methods may be used in concert with other methods. Drugs used for both women and men include clomiphene citrate, human menopausal gonadotropin (hMG), follicle-stimulating hormone (FSH), human chorionic gonadotropin (hCG), gonadotropin-releasing hormone (GnRH) analogues, aromatase inhibitors, and metformin.

Medical treatments 
Medical treatment of infertility generally involves the use of fertility medication, medical device, surgery, or a combination of the following. If the sperm is of good quality and the mechanics of the woman's reproductive structures are good (patent fallopian tubes, no adhesions or scarring), a course of ovulation induction may be used. The physician or WHNP may also suggest using a conception cap cervical cap, which the patient uses at home by placing the sperm inside the cap and putting the conception device on the cervix, or intrauterine insemination (IUI), in which the doctor or WHNP introduces sperm into the uterus during ovulation, via a catheter. In these methods, fertilization occurs inside the body.

If conservative medical treatments fail to achieve a full-term pregnancy, the physician or WHNP may suggest the patient to undergo in vitro fertilization (IVF). IVF and related techniques (ICSI, ZIFT, GIFT) are called assisted reproductive technology (ART) techniques.

ART techniques generally start with stimulating the ovaries to increase egg production. After stimulation, the physician surgically extracts one or more eggs from the ovary, and unites them with sperm in a laboratory setting, with the intent of producing one or more embryos. Fertilization takes place outside the body, and the fertilized egg is reinserted into the woman's reproductive tract, in a procedure called embryo transfer.

Other medical techniques are e.g. tuboplasty, assisted hatching, and preimplantation genetic diagnosis.

In vitro fertilization

IVF is the most commonly used ART. It has been proven useful in overcoming infertility conditions, such as blocked or damaged tubes, endometriosis, repeated IUI failure, unexplained infertility, poor ovarian reserve, poor or even nil sperm count.

Intracytoplasmic sperm injection

ICSI technique is used in case of poor semen quality, low sperm count or failed fertilization attempts during prior IVF cycles. This technique involves an injection of a single healthy sperm directly injected into mature egg. The fertilized embryo is then transferred to womb.

Tourism

Fertility tourism is the practice of traveling to another country for fertility treatments. It may be regarded as a form of medical tourism. The main reasons for fertility tourism are legal regulation of the sought procedure in the home country, or lower price. In-vitro fertilization and donor insemination are major procedures involved.

Stem cell therapy
Nowadays, there are several treatments (still in experimentation) related to stem cell therapy. It is a new opportunity, not only for partners with lack of gametes, but also for same-sex couples and single people who want to have offspring. Theoretically, with this therapy, we can get artificial gametes in vitro. There are different studies for both women and men.
 Spermatogonial stem cells transplant: it takes places in the seminiferous tubule. With this treatment, the patient experience spermatogenesis, and therefore, it has the chance to have offspring if he wants to. It is specially oriented for cancer patients, whose sperm is destroyed due to the gonadotoxic treatment they are submitted to.
 Ovarian stem cells: it is thought that women have a finite number of follicles from the very beginning. Nevertheless, scientists have found these stem cells, which may generate new oocytes in postnatal conditions. Apparently there are only 0.014% of them (this could be an explanation of why they were not discovered until now). There is still some controversy about their existence, but if the discoveries are true, this could be a new treatment for infertility.

Stem cell therapy is really new, and everything is still under investigation. Additionally, it could be the future for the treatment of multiple diseases, including infertility.  It will take time before these studies can be available for clinics and patients.

Epidemiology
Prevalence of infertility varies depending on the definition, i.e. on the time span involved in the failure to conceive.
 Infertility rates have increased by 4% since the 1980s, mostly from problems with fecundity due to an increase in age.
 Fertility problems affect one in seven couples in the UK. Most couples (about 84%) who have regular sexual intercourse (that is, every two to three days) and who do not use contraception get pregnant within a year. About 95 out of 100 couples who are trying to get pregnant do so within two years.
 Women become less fertile as they get older. For women aged 35, about 94% who have regular unprotected sexual intercourse get pregnant after three years of trying. For women aged 38, however, only about 77%. The effect of age upon men's fertility is less clear.
 In people going forward for IVF in the UK, roughly half of fertility problems with a diagnosed cause are due to problems with the man, and about half due to problems with the woman. However, about one in five cases of infertility have no clear diagnosed cause.
 In Britain, male factor infertility accounts for 25% of infertile couples, while 25% remain unexplained. 50% are female causes with 25% being due to anovulation and 25% tubal problems/other.
 In Sweden, approximately 10% of couples wanting children are infertile. In approximately one-third of these cases the man is the factor, in one third the woman is the factor, and in the remaining third the infertility is a product of factors on both parts.
 In many lower-income countries, estimating infertility is difficult due to incomplete information and stigma.

Society and culture
Perhaps except for infertility in science fiction, films and other fiction depicting emotional struggles of assisted reproductive technology have had an upswing first in the latter part of the 2000s decade, although the techniques have been available for decades. Yet, the number of people that can relate to it by personal experience in one way or another is ever-growing, and the variety of trials and struggles is huge.

Pixar's Up contains a depiction of infertility in an extended life montage that lasts the first few minutes of the film.

Other individual examples are referred to individual sub-articles of assisted reproductive technology

Ethics
There are several ethical issues associated with infertility and its treatment.
 High-cost treatments are out of financial reach for some couples.
 Debate over whether health insurance companies (e.g. in the US) should be required to cover infertility treatment.
 Allocation of medical resources that could be used elsewhere
 The legal status of embryos fertilized in vitro and not transferred in vivo. (See also beginning of pregnancy controversy).
 Opposition to the destruction of embryos not transferred in vivo.
 IVF and other fertility treatments have resulted in an increase in multiple births, provoking ethical analysis because of the link between multiple pregnancies, premature birth, and a host of health problems.
 Religious leaders' opinions on fertility treatments; for example, the Roman Catholic Church views infertility as a calling to adopt or to use natural treatments (medication, surgery, or cycle charting) and members must reject assisted reproductive technologies.
 Infertility caused by DNA defects on the Y chromosome is passed on from father to son. If natural selection is the primary error correction mechanism that prevents random mutations on the Y chromosome, then fertility treatments for men with abnormal sperm (in particular ICSI) only defer the underlying problem to the next male generation.
 Specific procedures, such as gestational surrogacy, have led to numerous ethical issues, particularly when people living in one country contract for surrogacy in another (transnational surrogacy).

Many countries have special frameworks for dealing with the ethical and social issues around fertility treatment.
 One of the best known is the HFEA – The UK's regulator for fertility treatment and embryo research. This was set up on 1 August 1991 following a detailed commission of enquiry led by Mary Warnock in the 1980s
 A similar model to the HFEA has been adopted by the rest of the countries in the European Union. Each country has its own body or bodies responsible for the inspection and licensing of fertility treatment under the EU Tissues and Cells directive
 Regulatory bodies are also found in Canada and in the state of Victoria in Australia

See also 
 Advanced maternal age
 Age and female fertility
 Antinatalism
 Birth control
 Childlessness
 Conception device
 Mossman–Pacey paradox
 Oncofertility, fertility in cancer patients
 Population control
 Sterility
 Surrogate marriage
 Voluntary childlessness

References

Further reading 

 
 Lock, Margaret and Vinh-Kim Nguyen. 2011. An anthropology of biomedicine: Wiley-Blackwell.
 
 
 
 
 

 RCOG clinical guidelines for infertility (concise guidelines)
 Fertility: Assessment and Treatment for People with Fertility Problems, 2004 (extensive guidelines)
 GeneReviews/NCBI/NIH/UW entry on CATSPER-Related Male Infertility
 Infertility not just a Female Problem
 Assisted Reproduction in Judaism
 Facing Life Without Children When It Isn't by Choice
 Patient Voices – Infertility

 
Fertility medicine
Women's health
Mycoplasma